The species name simplex (Latin for "simple") occurs frequently in binomial names throughout the taxonomy of life. Examples include:

Plants

Monocots
Amitostigma simplex, a species of plant in the family Orchidaceae
Bulbophyllum simplex, a species of orchid in the genus Bulbophyllum
Coelogyne simplex, a species of orchid
Puccinellia simplex, a species of grass known by the common names western alkali grass and California alkali grass
Oenocarpus simplex, a species of flowering plant in the family Arecaceae
Vriesea simplex, a species of the genus Vriesea

Eudicots
Acacia simplex, perennial climbing tree native to islands in the western part of the Pacific Ocean 
Buddleja simplex, a small shrub, probably extinct, as no record of it has been made for nearly 200 years
Brassaiopsis simplex, a species of plant in the family Araliaceae
Echium simplex (Tower of jewels), herbaceous biennial plant up to 3 m in height on the island of Tenerife mainly in Macizo de Anaga
Firmiana simplex, the Chinese parasol tree or wutong, an ornamental plant or tree of the cacao, or chocolate family Sterculiaceae of the order Malvales, native to Asia
Gentianopsis simplex, a species of flowering plant in the gentian family known by the common name oneflower fringed gentian
Gymnophragma simplex, a species of flowering plant belonging to the family Acanthaceae
Pseudopanax simplex, a species of evergreen plant
Stirlingia simplex, plant endemic to Western Australia
Utricularia simplex, commonly known as bluecoats, is a very small perennial carnivorous plant that belongs to the genus Utricularia

Fungi
Acrodontium simplex, ascomycete fungus that is a plant pathogen
Pleomeris simplex or Puccinia hordei, a plant pathogen

Animals

Cnidaria
Nemiana simplex, the only species in Nemiana, a genus of simple, sessile organisms
Protanthea simplex, a species of sea anemone found in deep water off the coasts of north west Europe
Tubularia simplex, or oaten pipes hydroid, a species of hydroid native to the northeast Atlantic Ocean, North Sea, Norwegian Sea, and English Channel

Molluscs

Bivalves
Anomia simplex, or the common jingle shell, a species of bivalve mollusc in the family Anomiidae

Gastropods (snails and slugs)
Arinia simplex, a species of small land snails with an operculum, terrestrial gastropod mollusks in the family Diplommatinidae
Bittium simplex, a species of sea snail, a marine gastropod mollusk in the family Cerithiidae
Blanfordia simplex, a species of land snail that has an operculum, a terrestrial gastropod mollusk in the family Pomatiopsidae
Boucardicus simplex, a species of land snail with an operculum, a terrestrial gastropod mollusk in the family Cyclophoridae
Calliostoma simplex, a species of sea snail, a marine gastropod mollusk in the family Calliostomatidae
Cirsonella simplex, minute sea snail, a marine gastropod mollusc in the family Turbinidae
Cristilabrum simplex, a species of air-breathing land snail, a terrestrial pulmonate gastropod mollusk in the family Camaenidae
Enatimene simplex, a species of sea snail, a marine gastropod mollusk in the family Muricidae, the murex snails or rock snails
Eulimella simplex, a species of sea snail, a marine gastropod mollusk in the family Pyramidellidae, the pyrams and their allies
Janoliva simplex, a species of sea snail, a marine gastropod mollusk in the family Olividae, the olives
Mohnia simplex, a species of sea snail, a marine gastropod mollusk in the family Buccinidae, the true whelks
Natica simplex, a species of predatory sea snail, a marine gastropod mollusk in the family Naticidae, the moon snails
Obesotoma simplex, a species of sea snail, a marine gastropod mollusk in the family Mangeliidae
Opisthostoma simplex, a species of minute land snail with an operculum, a terrestrial gastropod mollusk in the family Diplommatinidae
Pepta simplex, a species of sea snail, a marine gastropod mollusk in the family Cancellariidae, the nutmeg snails
Pyrgulopsis simplex or fossil springsnail, a species of minute freshwater spring snails, aquatic gastropod mollusks or micromollusks in the family Hydrobiidae
Serrata simplex, a species of sea snail, a marine gastropod mollusk in the family Marginellidae, the margin snails
Sukashitrochus simplex or Sukashitrochus morleti, a species of sea snail, a marine gastropod mollusk in the family Scissurellidae

Arthropods

Arachnids
Argiope simplex or Argiope trifasciata, also called banded garden spider in the USA, a species of spider found around the world
Digamasellus simplex, mite in the family Digamasellidae
Gamasellus simplex, in the genus of mites in the family Ologamasidae
Halolaelaps simplex, family of mites in the order Mesostigmata

Crustaceans
Acartia simplex, a species of marine copepod belonging to the family Acartiidae
Asconiscus simplex, the only species in the genus Asconiscus, family of marine isopod crustaceans in the suborder Cymothoida
Branchinella simplex, a species of crustacean in the family Thamnocephalidae
Ovatis simplex, a species of crabs in the family Xanthidae, the only species in the genus Ovatis
Paradiaptomus simplex, a species of copepod in the family Diaptomidae
Tropodiaptomus simplex, copepod in the family Diaptomidae

Insects

Lepidoptera (butterflies and moths)
Moths of the family Noctuidae:
Achaea simplex, a species of moth of the family Noctuidae
Avatha simplex, a species of moth of the family Noctuidae
Cyligramma simplex, moth of the family Noctuidae
Penicillaria simplex, moth of the family Noctuidae
Plusia simplex or Anagrapha falcifera, a moth of the family Noctuidae
Schinia simplex, moth of the family Noctuidae
Schrankia simplex or Schrankia altivolans, moth of the family Noctuidae
Speiredonia simplex, a species of moth of the family Noctuidae

Other lepidopterans:
Aloeides simplex, a butterfly of the family Lycaenidae
Anatrachyntis simplex, moth in the family Cosmopterigidae
Azygophleps simplex, moth in the family Cossidae
Chilo simplex or Chilo suppressalis, moth of the family Crambidae
Coleophora simplex, moth of the family Coleophoridae
Endotricha simplex, a species of snout moths in the genus Endotricha
Eriogaster simplex or Panacela lewinae is a moth of the family Eupterotidae
Eulophota simplex, a species of snout moths in the genus Eulophota
Hemistola simplex, moth of the family Geometridae
Oroplema simplex, a species of moth of the family Uraniidae
Proutiella simplex, moth of the family Notodontidae

Other insects
Anabrus simplex or Mormon cricket, large insect that can grow to almost three inches in length
Chlaenius simplex, a ground beetle in the large and diverse genus Chlaenius
Holcobius simplex, beetle species in the family Anobiidae
Mirosternus simplex, beetle species in the family Anobiidae
Rhadinosticta simplex or Rhadinosticta, a species of damselfly in the family Isostictidae
Rhamphomyia simplex, a species of dance fly, in the fly family Empididae
Thesprotia simplex, common name grass mantis, is a species of praying mantis found in Brazil
Urophora simplex, a species of tephritid or fruit flies in the genus Urophora of the family Tephritidae

Chordates

Birds
Anthreptes simplex or plain sunbird, a species of bird in the family Nectariniidae
Calamonastes simplex or grey wren warbler, a species of bird in the family Cisticolidae
Chlorocichla simplex or simple greenbul, a species of songbird in the family Pycnonotidae
Columba simplex or lemon dove or cinnamon dove, a bird species in the pigeon family (Columbidae)
Geoffroyus simplex, blue-collared parrot, simple parrot, lilac-collared song parrot, or lilac-collared Geoffroy's parrot, found in New Guinea
Myrmothera simplex or tepui antpitta or brown-breasted antpitta, a species of bird in the family Formicariidae
Pachycephala simplex or grey whistler, a species of bird in the family Pachycephalidae
Passer simplex or desert sparrow, a bird of the sparrow family Passeridae
Phaetusa simplex or large-billed tern, a species of tern in the family Sternidae
Piculus simplex or Rufous-winged Woodpecker, a species of bird in the family Picidae
Pogoniulus simplex or green tinkerbird, a species of bird in the family Lybiidae
Pseudotriccus simplex or hazel-fronted pygmy tyrant, a species of bird in the family Tyrannidae
Pycnonotus simplex or cream-vented bulbul, a species of songbird in the family Pycnonotidae
Rhytipterna simplex or greyish mourner, a species of bird in the family Tyrannidae
Sporophila simplex or drab seedeater, a species of bird in the family Thraupidae

Other vertebrates
Betta simplex, a species of fish in the family Osphronemidae
Hesperomys simplex, a species of rodent in the family Cricetidae from south-central South America
Hyla simplex, a species of frog in the family Hylidae
Melanophryniscus simplex, a species of toad in the family Bufonidae
Sarcoglanis simplex, a species of catfish (order Siluriformes) of the family Trichomycteridae, and the only species of the genus Sarcoglanis

Taxonomic lists